Orbiting Geophysical Observatory (OGO) Program  of NASA refers to the six satellites launched by the United States that were in use from September 1964 to 1972, designed to study the Earth's magnetosphere. The satellites successfully studied the interactions between the Earth and the Sun, despite a number of technical problems. Each satellite had 20 to 25 instruments. OGO 1, OGO 3, and OGO 5 were in equatorial orbits; OGO 2, OGO 4, and OGO 6 were in lower polar orbits.
 WW2 Cargo Pilot Wilfred "Bill" Scull was the project manager for all 6 OGO projects. His biography is detailed in a 3-book series. WW2 Cargo Pilots series along with many other photos of the projects, including hand-drawn sketches of the satellites.

OGO launch chronology

 OGO 1 1964-054A NORAD ID: 00879 Launched: 4 September 1964 On-orbit dry mass: 487 kg (decayed 29 August 2020) 
 OGO 2 1965-081A NORAD ID: 01620 Launched: 14 October 1965  On-orbit dry mass: 507 kg (decayed 17 September 1981)
 OGO 3 1966-049A NORAD ID: 02195 Launched: 7 June 1966  On-orbit dry mass: 515 kg (decayed 14 September 1981)
 OGO 4 1967-073A NORAD ID: 02895 Launched: 28 July 1967 On-orbit dry mass: 562 kg (decayed 16 August 1972)
 OGO 5 1968-014A NORAD ID: 03138 Launched: 4 March 1968  On-orbit dry mass: 611 kg (decayed 2 July 2011)
 OGO 6 1969-051A NORAD ID: 03986 Launched: 5 June 1969  On-orbit dry mass: 632 kg (decayed 12 October 1979)

OGO 1
The purpose of the OGO 1 spacecraft, the first of a series of six Orbiting Geophysical Observatories, was to conduct diversified geophysical experiments to obtain a better understanding of the Earth as a planet and to develop and operate a standardized observatory-type satellite. OGO 1 consisted of a main body that was parallelepipedal in form, two solar panels, each with a solar-oriented experiment package (SOEP), two orbital plane experiment packages (OPEP) and six appendages EP-1 through EP-6 supporting the boom experiment packages. One face of the main body was designed to point toward the Earth (+Z axis), and the line connecting the two solar panels (X axis) was intended to be perpendicular to the Earth-Sun-spacecraft plane. The solar panels were able to rotate about the X axis. The OPEPs were mounted on and could rotate about an axis which was parallel to the Z axis and attached to the main body. Due to a boom deployment failure shortly after orbital injection, the spacecraft was put into a permanent spin mode of 5 rpm about the Z axis. This spin axis remained fixed with a declination of about -10 deg and right ascension of about 40 deg at launch. The initial local time of apogee was 2100 h. OGO 1 carried 20 experiments. Twelve of these were particle studies and two were magnetic field studies. In addition, there was one experiment for each of the following types of studies: interplanetary dust, VLF, Lyman-alpha, gegenschein, atmospheric mass, and radio astronomy. Real-time data were transmitted at 1, 8, or 64 kbs depending on the distance of the spacecraft from the Earth. Playback data were tape recorded at 1 kbs and transmitted at 64 kbs. Two wideband transmitters, one feeding into an omnidirectional antenna and the other feeding into a directional antenna, were used to transmit data. A special-purpose telemetry system, feeding into either antenna, was also used to transmit wideband data in real time only. Tracking was accomplished by using radio beacons and a range and range-rate S-band transponder. Because of the boom deployment failure, the best operating mode for the data handling system was the use of one of the wideband transmitters and the directional antenna. All data received from the omnidirectional antenna were noisy. During September 1964, acceptable data were received over 70% of the orbital path. By June 1969, data acquisition was limited to 10% of the orbital path. The spacecraft was placed in a standby status November 25, 1969, and all support was terminated November 1, 1971. By April 1970 the spacecraft perigee had increased to 46,000 km and the inclination had increased to 58.8 deg.

OGO-1 reentry 
The University of Arizona’s Catalina Sky Survey (CSS), funded by NASA’s Planetary Defense Coordination Office (PDCO), detected an object late in the evening of 25 August 2020 which appeared to be on an impact trajectory with Earth. Two Maui middle school students also observed the 250-pound object. Maui Waena Intermediate School eighth-graders Holden Suzuki and Wilson Chau, with mentor outreach astronomer J.D. Armstrong of the University of Hawaii Institute for Astronomy (IfA), used data from the Las Cumbres Observatory (LCO) Faulkes Telescope North on Haleakala to track OGO-1. The University of Hawaii’s Asteroid Terrestrial-impact Last Alert System (ATLAS), also funded by PDCO, independently observed the object. Further observations were conducted by CSS to confirm the object’s trajectory. Precision orbit calculations were conducted by the Center for Near-Earth Object (NEO) Studies (CNEOS) at NASA’s Jet Propulsion Laboratory, and compared to data from the European Space Agency’s NEO Coordination Center. The object was confirmed to be not an asteroid, but in fact Orbiting Geophysical Observatory-1 (OGO-1). OGO-1 reentered Earth’s atmosphere and disintegrated on Saturday evening, 29 August 2020 over Southern French Polynesia. Video of reentry

Non-Earth observations

In 1970 OGO-5 used its ultraviolet photometer to observe comets Encke, Tago-Sato-Kosaka (1969 IX) and Bennett (1970 II).

Notes

References 

 
 
 
 Biography of Wilfred Scull, OGO project manager

Satellites orbiting Earth
Satellites formerly orbiting Earth